The Greatest Hits – Volume 1: 20 Good Vibrations is a compilation album of songs by American rock band The Beach Boys, released in 1995 by Capitol Records. The album features The Beach Boys' biggest hits from 1962-1966, but also includes the 1988 No. 1 hit "Kokomo".

After the album was certified 2x platinum by the RIAA, Capitol made the decision to create sequels to the collection, so the original release was updated accordingly and reissued. The updated version was issued on September 21, 1999, the same day that its sequel, The Greatest Hits – Volume 2: 20 More Good Vibrations, appeared. On the 1999 reissue, the track listing is in chronological order, and the album versions of "Be True to Your School" and "Help Me, Rhonda" are replaced by the original single versions.

This collection is also notable for crediting Murry Wilson, not Nick Venet, as producer of "Surfin' Safari" and "409", while also modifying the credits of "Surfin' U.S.A." and "Shut Down" to reflect Brian Wilson's role as producer.

In March 2000, The Greatest Hits – Volume 2 charted at No. 95 in the United States and remained on the charts for 11 weeks, following the broadcast of the ABC TV movie The Beach Boys: An American Family.

Track listing

1995 version
All songs are by Brian Wilson and Mike Love, except where noted.

1999 version
All songs are by Brian Wilson and Mike Love and are mono single mixes, except where noted.

Certifications

References

1995 greatest hits albums
1999 greatest hits albums
The Beach Boys compilation albums
Capitol Records compilation albums